Tailgate, Tailgating, or variants of Tailgator may refer to:

Automobile
 3-way tailgate, a door or gate at the back of a vehicle
 Tailgating, following another vehicle too closely
 Tailgating, gaining access to restricted areas by following another person, see Piggybacking (security)
 Tailgate party, a social event around the open tailgate of a vehicle

Entertainment
 Tailgate (album), a 2010 album by Trailer Choir
 "Tailgate" (How I Met Your Mother), TV series episode
 Tailgate, cartoon character from The Transformers
 Tail 'Gator, video game
 The Tailgators, a 1980s Cajun band

Other uses
 Tailgater (Dish Network)
 Tailgating, privately purchasing or selling a security by a broker immediately after trading in the same security for a client, see front running